Sufetula may refer to:

places and jurisdictions
 an ancient city, whose Roman ruins are in Sbeitla, in modern Tunisia
 its former Roman diocese Sufetula (see), now a Catholic titular bishopric

biology
 Sufetula (moth), a moth genus